Ana Istarú (born 3 February 1960 in San José, Costa Rica) is a Costa Rican poet, actress, and screenwriter. Best known for her feminist poetry, she has also co-written the screenplay for the movie Caribe (2004).

References 

1960 births
Living people
Costa Rican poets
Costa Rican actresses